Jordan Suecof (born December 2, 1983), known primarily by his alias Infinity, is an American producer. He is best known for his work with artists such as Mary J. Blige, R. Kelly, Ciara, Jacob Latimore, and Ludacris. He was a member of Capharnaum.

Career
Suecof was born in Connecticut, United States. Drums were an immediate attachment and rocked on to master all things musical beginning in 1983. He began the indelible processing of making sound matter. From the bass-driven beat of the Beatles to the radiating wail of the rock era, Jordan wound down Led Zeppelin, Billy Joel and The Who.

Graduation at 17, Jordan GPS'd his way to the Dirty South; first stop Orlando. His first placement came in 2005. At 21 he had a #1 Adult AC chart-topper that led to the Grammy-winning album The Breakthrough by Mary J. Blige. As the producer of "Take Me As I Am", the album also won a Grammy for Best R&B Album. That track also garnered an ASCAP award and major media buzz for Infinity as he took home the props for R&B Song of the Year. Atlantic Records took notice. Fast-track to Lupe Fiasco's album Food and Liquor. In 2008, Jordan co-produced "DayDreamin" which also won the Grammy for Best Urban/Alternative Performance. 
 
In 2009, Infinity produced with the Backstreet Boys (Shattered). Then came R Kelly's "Echo" and "Banging the Headboard". Flipside to Ludacris', 2010, "I Know You Got a Man" with Flo Rida. Battle of the Sexes album was certified gold. Next step, Ciara in stilettos, and Yeah I Know that made the Basic Instinct album.

Infinity wound up producing Jacob Latimore on Jive Records. Their first collaboration "Like Em All", immediately garnered over 500k views on YouTube. It became the official first single.

In 2014, Infinity has leaped major boundaries from the title track and single off Tank's album, Stronger to the Avicii album, Stories, in which he helped produce and write "The Nights". "The Nights" surfaced online where it hit number one on Hype Machine before being released via FIFA 15.

Selected discography

References

1983 births
Living people
Songwriters from Connecticut
Record producers from Connecticut
People from Avon, Connecticut
American record producers
American male songwriters